Brandon D. Williams (born February 27, 1975) is an American former professional basketball player.

Born in Collinston, Louisiana, Williams attended Phillips Exeter Academy and played collegiately for Davidson College. He played professionally in the NBA for the Golden State Warriors (1997–98), San Antonio Spurs (1998–99, NBA champions) and Atlanta Hawks (2002–03). He appeared in 18 NBA games with averages of 9.1 MPG, 2.3 PPG and 1.0 RPG. He was also under contract with the Toronto Raptors (1997), Milwaukee Bucks (1999 and 2004), New York Knicks (2000) and Seattle SuperSonics (2000), but never played any regular season games for those teams. Williams was named to the All-Continental Basketball Association (CBA) Second Team in 2000 while playing for the La Crosse Bobcats.

In September 2013, he was named the general manager of the Delaware 87ers. On February 4, 2016 he was promoted to Chief of Staff for the Philadelphia 76ers. On July 30, 2017, Williams was hired as the new assistant general manager of the Sacramento Kings, replacing the role that was previously held by Scott Perry for only a few months. Aside from his basketball career, Williams attended law school at Rutgers Law from 2009-2013.

References 

1975 births
Living people
American men's basketball players
Atlanta Hawks players
Basketball players from Louisiana
Davidson Wildcats men's basketball players
Golden State Warriors players
Greek Basket League players
Huntsville Flight players
La Crosse Bobcats players
People from Morehouse Parish, Louisiana
San Antonio Spurs players
Shooting guards
Sioux Falls Skyforce (CBA) players
Undrafted National Basketball Association players
American expatriate basketball people in the Philippines
Philippine Basketball Association imports
TNT Tropang Giga players